was a Japanese incidental music composer from Hiroshima. He graduated from the Kunitachi College of Music in 1957. Yokoyama is best known for his work on the anime series Saint Seiya and Space Pirate Captain Harlock, and for his symphonic sound for many television programs. In 1992, he won the JASRAC award for his work on Saint Seiya. On July 8, 2017, Yokoyama died from pneumonia at age 82.

Notable works

Tokusatsu
Koseidon (1978–1979)
Megaloman (1979)
Metalder (1987–1988)
Winspector (1990–1991)
Ohranger (1995–1996)

Anime

TV series
The New Adventures of Hutch the Honeybee (1974)
Ginguiser (1977)
Space Pirate Captain Harlock (1978–1979)
Armored Fleet Dairugger XV (1982–1983)
Ikkiman (1986)
Saint Seiya (1986–1989)
Magical Taluluto (1990–1992)
Merhen Ōkoku (1995)

Films
Dracula: Sovereign of the Damned (1980)
Haguregumo (1982)
Shōnen Miyamoto Musashi (1982)
Future War 198X (1982)
The Snow Country Prince (1985)
Saint Seiya films (1987–2004)
Magical Taluluto films (1991–1992)
Sangōkushi trilogy (1992–1994)
GeGeGe no Kitarō: Explosive Japan!! (2008)

OVAs
Series
The Human Revolution (1995–2004)
Saint Seiya: Hades (2002–2008)

Single episode
Aoi Umi to Shōnen (1983)
Shōnen to Sakura (1983)
The Princess and the Moon (1984)
Panzer World Galient: Crest of Iron (1986)
Xanadu: The Legend of Dragon Slayer (1987)
Rainbow Across the Pacific Ocean (1990)
Kanta and the Deer (1990)
Journey to Hiroshima (1994)
The Two Princes (1996)
Peace River (1998)
The Himalayan Kingdom of Light (1999)
The Prince and the White Horse (2000)
The Prince and the Coral Sea (2000)
The Princess of the Desert Kingdom (2001)
The Treasures of the Desert (2002)
The Flower and the Phoenix (2004)

Image albums
Kaze to Ki no Uta (1980)

References

External links
 
 
 Seiji Yokoyama's anime works at the Media Arts Database 

1935 births
2017 deaths
Anime composers
Deaths from pneumonia in Japan
Japanese film score composers
Japanese male film score composers
Japanese male musicians
Japanese musicians
Kunitachi College of Music alumni
Musicians from Hiroshima Prefecture